Grevillea berryana is a species of flowering plant in the family Proteaceae and is endemic to the Pilbara, Mid West and Goldfields regions of Western Australia. It is a shrub or tree with mostly divided leaves with linear lobes and clusters of pale cream-coloured to yellow flowers.

Description
The lower surface of the leaves has two longitudinal grooves.

Taxonomy
Grevillea berryana was first formally described in 1909 by Alfred James Ewart and Jean White in the Proceedings of the Royal Society of Victoria from specimens collected by Frederick Arthur Rodway near Malcolm in 1907. The specific epithet (berryana) honours Richard James Arthur Berry.

Distribution and habitat
This grevillea grows in a range of habitats from grassland to shrubland in flat to rocky places and is widely distributed between Menzies, the eastern Gibson Desert, Mount Magnet and the lower Fortescue River in northern Western Australia.

Conservation status
Grevillea berryana is listed as "not threatened" by the Government of Western Australia Department of Biodiversity, Conservation and Attractions.

References

berryana
Proteales of Australia
Eudicots of Western Australia
Taxa named by Alfred James Ewart
Plants described in 1909